Ameru may refer to:

 Milea, Ioannina, an Aromanian village in Greece
 Ameru people, a Bantu ethnic group in Meru County, Kenya